The Wadai Sultanate ( Saltanat Waday, Fur: Burgu or Birgu; 1501–1912) was an African sultanate located to the east of Lake Chad in present-day Chad and the Central African Republic. It emerged in the seventeenth century under the leadership of the first sultan, Abd al-Karim, who overthrew the ruling Tunjur people of the area. It occupied land previously held by the Sultanate of Darfur (in present-day Sudan) to the northeast of the Sultanate of Baguirmi.

History

Origins 
Prior to the 1630s, Wadai, also known as Burgu to the people of Darfur, was a pre-Islamic Tunjur kingdom, established around 1501. The Arab migrants to the area which became Wadai claimed to be descendants of the Abbasid Caliphs, specifically from Salih ibn Abdallah ibn Abbas. Yame, an Abbasid leader, settled with Arab migrants in Debba, near the future capital of Ouara (Wara).

In 1635, the Maba and other small groups in the region rallied to the Islamic banner of Abd al-Karim Al Abbasi (son of Yame the Abbasid), who was descended from an Abbasid noble family, led an invasion from the east and overthrew the ruling Tunjur dynasty (who originated from the east in Darfur), who at the time was led by a king named Daud. Abd al-Karim secured and centralized his power in the area by marrying the Tunjur King Daud's daughter, Meiram Aisa, and then forming other marriage pacts with local dynasties and tribes, such as the Mahamid and Beni Halba tribes. Abd al-Karim became the first Kolak (Sultan) of a dynasty that lasted until the arrival of the French.

During much of the 17th and 18th century, the history of Wadai is marked by wars between Wadai and the Sultanate of Darfur, Bagirmi, Kanem-Bornu. They fought for access to Wadai's slaves and eunuchs for sale to the Arab courts. Under the rule of Abd al-Karim's grandson, Ya'qub Arus (1681–1707), the country suffered terrible drought that lasted for several years.

Expansion
After 1804, during the reign of Muhammad Sabun (r. 1804 – c. 1815), the Sultanate of Wadai began to expand its power as it profited considerably from its strategic position astride the trans-Saharan trade routes. A new trade route to the north was found, via Ennedi, Kufra and Jalu-Awjila to Benghazi, and Sabun outfitted royal caravans to take advantage of it. He began minting his own coinage and imported chain mail, moukhalas, and military advisers from North Africa, along with using the wealth generated from the trade of exotic animals like giraffes, lions, antelopes and camels, with there also being the trade of elephants and their ivory to fill the state's treasury. Many kingdoms were either conquered or forced to become tributaries, giving horses for the cavalry and trade, servants for the Kolak along with slaves. Sabun's successors were less able than he, and Darfur took advantage of a disputed political succession in 1838 to put its own candidate in power in Ouara, the capital of Wadai.

This tactic backfired, however, when Darfur's choice, Muhammad Sharif, rejected Darfur's meddling and asserted his own authority. In doing so, he gained acceptance from Wadai's various factions and went on to become Wadai's ablest ruler. Sharif conducted military campaigns as far west as Bornu and eventually established Wadai's hegemony over the Bagirmi Sultanate and other kingdoms as far away as the Chari River. Sharif ruled between 1835 to 1858; he introduced the Sanusiyah Islamic brotherhood to the region. In Mecca, Sharif had met the founder of the Sanusiyah Islamic brotherhood Muhammad ibn Ali as-Senussi, his movement being strong among the inhabitants of Cyrenaica (in present-day Libya), which became a dominant political force and source of resistance to French colonization.

Decline

Europeans under the German Gustav Nachtigal first explored the area in 1873. It would eventually lose its independence from the French in 1904. However, fighting against the French still continued until 1908 when Sultan Doud Murra proclaimed jihad against the French. However, by 1912 the French managed to pacify the region and abolished the sultanate.

The Wadai Sultanate was reconstituted under French suzerainty in 1935, with Muhammad Urada ibn Ibrahim becoming Kolak, or sultan. The sultanate continues under the suzerainty of the Republic of Chad and its current Kolak since 1977 is Ibrahim ibn Muhammad Urada.

It became a part of the independent Republic of Chad on the day of the country's independence in 1960. The Ouaddaï Region of modern Chad covers part of the area of the old kingdom. Its major town is Abéché.

Military 
Under Abd al-Karim Sabun in the early 19th century, Wadai forces were equipped with chain mail and firearms. In the 1840s–50s, Wadai possessed 300 guns. The figure went upwards to 4000 flintlock muskets by the 1870s. Sultan Ali (1858–1874) hired Turkish and Egyptian mechanics to cast 12 bronze and small caliber cannons. These cannons lacked carriages and Gustav Nachtigal concluded in the 19th century that they were ineffective. 

Wadai could deploy about 5–6000 cavalry of which a third of the cavalry men wore quilted armor whiles several more wore steel armor. Infantry could amount up to 56–60,000. The army was divided into two wings and a centre with the Sultan located behind the centre. The Sultan was protected by shield bearers who bore iron shields as well as "the troop of path makers" who cleared way for the Sultan's mobility through the bush. There existed the korayat who were mostly armed with lances. The aqid stood at the of the centre with royal slaves armed with muskets. Evidence exists for the use of explosives in warfare such as the siege of Massenya in 1870. Under directions from a man of Bornu, the army of Sultan Ali (1858–1874) buried a copper-coated basket full of gunpowder near the walls of Massenya. The basket was connected to the Wadai camp by gunpowder wrapped in cloth and further covered with dirt. The cloth was lit from its end leading to an explosion of the mine and the breach of Massenya's walls.

Tactics 
Wadai forces were noted by French sources for their poor gun handling and insufficient training. In 1902, a French source from Dar Kuti states the Wadai army preferred to go on offence with cavalry and rely on firearms only for defense. Another source within that period documented that Wadai soldiers;
 
Outflanking and encirclement were documented as a tactic of Wadai for the first time in 1908.

Gallery

See also 
List of rulers of Wadai
Dar al Kuti

References

Bibliography

External links

www.waddai.com 

Former empires in Africa
Sahelian kingdoms
History of Central Africa
2nd millennium in Chad
History of the Central African Republic
French Equatorial Africa
17th century in Africa
18th century in Africa
States and territories established in 1635
States and territories disestablished in 1909
1635 establishments in Africa
1909 disestablishments in Africa